Kumkum, born Zaibunnisa (08 June 1934 – 28 July 2020), was an Indian actress.

She acted in approximately 115 films during her career. She is best known for her roles in Mr. X in Bombay (1964), Mother India (1957), Son of India (1962), Kohinoor (1960), Ujala, Naya Daur, Shreeman Funtoosh, Ek Sapera Ek Lutera, Ganga Ki Laharen, Raja Aur Runk, Aankhen (1968), Lalkaar, Geet and Ek Kuwara Ek Kuwari. She paired with many film heroes of her era and was popular in roles alongside Kishore Kumar.

Kumkum also acted in Bhojpuri films, starting with Ganga Maiyya Tohe Piyari Chadhaibo (1963), which was also the first ever Bhojpuri film.

Early life 
Kumkum's birth name is Zaibunnisa Khan. She was born in a prestigious Muslim family to Sayed Manzoor Hassan Nawab of Hussainabad in Sheikhpura district of Bihar and Khursheed Bano.

Kumkum married Sajjad Akbar Khan who hailed from Lucknow, India and worked in Saudi Arabia. Kumkum shifted to Saudi Arabia after her marriage and returned to India after 23 years in 1995. The couple had two children—Andaleeb Akbar Khan (daughter) and Hadi Ali Abrar (son).

Career
Kumkum was discovered by Guru Dutt. Guru Dutt was to picturize the song "Kabhi Aar Kabhi Paar Laaga Teere Nazar" for his movie Aar Paar (1954) on his friend Jagdeep (father of Javed Jaffery, Naved Jaffery), but later decided to picturize this song on a female actor. But at that time, no one agreed to do a small song. Then Guru Dutt finally picturized this song on Kumkum. Later, Kumkum was seen in a small role in Pyaasa (1957). The famous song "Yeh Hai Bombay Meri Jaan" from C.I.D (1956), sung by Geeta Dutt was picturized on her. She was also paired alongside Shammi Kapoor in a side role in Mem Saheb (1956) and also in lead opposite Shammi Kapoor in Char Dil Char Raahein (1959).

She was trained in Kathak by the noted Pandit, Shambhu Maharaj. She showed her dancing talents in the film Kohinoor (1960) with Dilip Kumar. "Madhuban Mein Radhika Nache Re" and "Haye Jaadugar Qaatil, Haazir Hai Mera Dil", sung by Asha Bhosle for Naushad were picturized on Kumkum. She was paired opposite Kishore Kumar in films like Ganga Ki Laharen, Shreeman Funtoosh, Haaye Mera Dil and Mr. X in Bombay. She was leading heroine in all-time favorite Hindi Sad song "mere mehboob kayamat hogi" from mr. x in Bombay. This was a science fiction movie of that time and Kumkum was a great star.  The songs like "Khoobsurat Haseena" from Mr. X in Bombay, "Ijazat Ho Toh" from Haaye Mera Dil, "Sultana Sultana" from Shreeman Funtoosh and "Machalti Hui" from Ganga Ki Lahren, which were picturized on the pair Kishore-Kumkum remains popular since their release to this day.

Kumkum was a favorite choice for writer director Ramanand Sagar. Sagar decided to cast Kumkum as Dharmendra's sister in Ankhen, a super hit film of 1968. In 1970, for Geet, Kumkum was Ramanand Sagar's choice for a small role. But in Lalkar (1972), she was paired with Dharmendra, while Rajendra Kumar was paired with Mala Sinha. Kumkum was paired with Kiran Kumar in Jalte Badan (1973), produced, directed and written once again by Sagar. She was paired opposite Vinod Khanna in Dhamkee in 1973 and the duet song "Chand Kya Hai Roop Ka Darpan" became hugely popular. She was paired opposite Pran in the comedy film Ek Kuwara Ek Kuwari, directed by Prakash Mehra, which was a blockbuster.

After her marriage, Kumkum left the industry.

Bhojpuri Films

Kumkum was one of the top stars in the first phase of Bhojpuri films which began with Ganga Maiyya Tohe Piyari Chadhaibo (1962). In his book, Cinema Bhojpuri, Avijit Ghosh writes that she also acted in Laagi Nahi Chhute Ram (1963), Balma Bada Nadaan (1964), Naihar Chhutal Jaye (1964), Bhauji (1965) and Ganga (1965), which was also her home production. "Two heroines who ruled the first phase of Bhojpuri films were Kumkum and Naaz. Scripts were often written around their characters and to their credit, they often proved equal to the task," Ghosh writes in the same book.

Death
Kumkum died on 28 July 2020 at her residence in Mumbai, aged 86.

Filmography

 Aar Paar (1954) as dancer in song "Kabhi Aar Kabhi Paar" (Uncredited Role)
 Mirza Ghalib (1954)
 Mr. & Mrs. '55 (1955)
 House No. 44 (1955)
 Kundan (1955)
 Funtoosh (1956)
 Mem Sahib (1956)
 Naya Andaz (1956)
 C.I.D. (1956)
 Basant Bahar (1956)
 Naya Daur (1957)
 Mother India (1957)
 Pyaasa (1957)
 Baarish (1957)
 Ghar Sansar (1958)
 Char Dil Char Rahen (1959)
 Shararat (1959)
 Kali Topi Lal Rumal (1959)
 Ujala (1959)
 Kohinoor (1960)
 Dil Bhi Tera Hum Bhi Tere (1960)
 Son Of India (1962)
 King Kong (1962)
 Sher Khan (1962)
 Ganga Maiyya Tohe Piyari Chadhaibo (1962, Bhojpuri)
 Laagi Nahi Chhute Ram (1963, Bhojpuri)
 Mr. X in Bombay (1964)
 Ganga Ki Lahren (1964)
 Ek Sapera Ek Lutera (1965)
 Shreeman Funtoosh (1965)
 Main Wahi Hoon (1966)
 Raja Aur Runk (1968)
 Ankhen (1968)
 Gunah Aur Kanoon (1970)
 Geet (1970)
 Aan Baan (1972)
 Lalkar (1972)
 Dhamkee (1973)
 Jalte Badan (1973)
 Ek Kunwari Ek Kunwara (1973)

References

External links
 

2020 deaths
Indian film actresses
Actresses in Hindi cinema
Actresses in Bhojpuri cinema
20th-century Indian actresses
Actresses from Bihar
1934 births